Brucea macrocarpa is a species of plant in the Simaroubaceae family. It is endemic to Kenya, and is being threatened by habitat loss.

References

macrocarpa
Endemic flora of Kenya
Taxonomy articles created by Polbot